The Shanghai Gesture is a 1941 American film noir directed by Josef von Sternberg and starring Gene Tierney, Walter Huston, Victor Mature, and Ona Munson. It is based on a Broadway play of the same name by John Colton, which was adapted for the screen by Sternberg and produced by Arnold Pressburger for United Artists. It was the last Hollywood film Sternberg ever completed: Howard Hughes fired him halfway through production of Macao in 1951, as well as from Jet Pilot the year prior. 

Boris Leven received an Academy Award nomination for Best Art Direction, while Richard Hageman was nominated for Best Original Music Score.

Plot
Gigolo "Doctor" Omar (Victor Mature) bribes the Shanghai police not to jail the broke American showgirl Dixie Pomeroy (Phyllis Brooks); he invites her to seek a job at the casino owned by Dragon-lady "Mother" Gin Sling (Ona Munson), his boss.

In the casino, Omar attracts the attention of a beautiful, privileged young woman  (Gene Tierney), fresh from a European finishing school. She is out for some excitement. When asked, she gives her name as "Poppy" Smith.

Meanwhile, Gin Sling is informed that she must move her establishment to the much less desirable Chinese sector. She is given five or six weeks, until Chinese New Year, to comply. Gin Sling is confident that she can thwart this threat to her livelihood, and orders her minions to find out everything they can about the man behind it, Englishman Sir Guy Charteris (Walter Huston), a wealthy entrepreneur who has purchased a large area of Shanghai that contains her gambling parlor. Dixie proves to be an unexpected source of information; Charteris had taken her out to dinner a number of times, before dumping her to avoid her meeting his newly arrived daughter, Poppy, whose real name is Victoria Charteris. From Dixie's description, Gin Sling realizes Charteris is someone from her past.

Meanwhile, Poppy falls in love with Omar and becomes addicted to gambling and alcohol. Though the spoiled woman is openly contemptuous of the casino owner, Gin Sling allows her credit to cover her ever-growing losses.

Gin Sling invites Charteris and other important dignitaries to a Chinese New Year dinner party. Charteris at first declines, but then curiosity gets the better of him. At the dinner, she exposes his disgraceful past. Charteris, then calling himself Victor Dawson, had married her. One day, he abandoned her, taking her inheritance, leaving her destitute and alone. Thinking her baby had died and forced to do whatever she had to in order to survive, she wandered from place to place, until she reached Shanghai. There, Percival Howe had faith in her and backed her financially, allowing her to work her way up to her current position.

To cap her revenge, she has Victoria brought in. Victoria openly flaunts her attraction to Omar and ridicules her father. As Charteris takes his wayward daughter out, he tells Van Elst privately to come to his office the next morning to pick up a £20,000 check for Gin Sling and tell her "the funds she claims I took are, and always have been in an account in her name" in a north China bank.

Despite hearing this, Victoria defies him and goes back inside where the other guests have left. When he tries to retrieve her, he is confronted by Gin Sling. He then reveals that their baby had been found alive and put in a hospital where Charteris found her and brought her up far from China. Victoria is Gin Sling's own daughter.

Gin Sling then tries to talk to Victoria alone, revealing that she is her mother, but when the young woman continues insulting her, Gin Sling shoots her dead. The Dragon Lady then remarks to Howe that this is something she cannot bribe her way out of. The muscular coolie, standing outside with Charteris, delivers the bitingly ironic last line "you likee Chinese New Year?" as Charteris realizes what has happened.

Cast
 Gene Tierney as Poppy (Victoria Charteris)
 Walter Huston as Sir Guy Charteris (aka Victor Dawson)
 Victor Mature as "Doctor" Omar
 Ona Munson as "Mother" Gin Sling
 Phyllis Brooks as The Chorus Girl, Dixie Pomeroy
 Albert Bassermann as Van Elst
 Maria Ouspenskaya as The Amah
 Eric Blore as The Bookkeeper, Caesar Hawkins
 Ivan Lebedeff as The Gambler, Boris
 Mike Mazurki as The Coolie
 Clyde Fillmore as The Comprador, Percival Montgomery Howe
 Grayce Hampton as The Social Leader, Lady Blessington
 Rex Evans as The Counselor, Mr. Jackson
 Mikhail Rasumny as The Appraiser, Mischa Vaginisky
 Michael Dalmatoff as The Bartender
 Marcel Dalio as The Master of the Spinning Wheel, Marcel
 Leyland Hodgson as Ryerson

Production
There were several attempts to turn the play into a film in the 1930s, one of them by Cecil B. DeMille, and another in the early 1930s by Edward Small at United Artists. By 1940, it was estimated there had been 32 previous attempts to film the play. Among the changes made to appease the censor was the replacement of the Japanese character of Prince Oshima with Dr Omar to avoid depicting miscegenation. Filming began on August 11, 1941.

In the listing of actors in the opening credits is an ending title card honoring the extras reading, "And a large cast of 'HOLLYWOOD EXTRAS' who without expecting credit or mention stand ready day and night to do their best—and who at their best are more than good enough to deserve mention." Keye Luke painted the mural displayed in the casino.

Reception
Variety described it as "a rather dull and hazy drama of the Orient." "Victor Mature, as the matter-of-fact Arab despoiler of Tierney’s honor, provides a standout performance. Huston’s abilities are lost in the jumble, while Munson cannot penetrate the mask-like makeup arranged for her characterization."

Oleg Cassini later said "Both Gene and I were hopeful," about the movie. "A prestigious director, a good cast... perhaps this would lead to other opportunities. But the film was an overwrought turkey destroyed by the critics, who gave Gene her first bad reviews. My costumes were not even mentioned in passing."

In 2005, film critic Dennis Schwartz gave the film a positive review, writing, "Josef von Sternberg's (The Scarlet Empress/The Blue Angel/The Devil is a Woman) last great Hollywood film is based on a 1925 play by John Colton that required over 30 revisions ordered by the Breen Office censors before it was deemed acceptable. In one unreleased censored version, attributed to writer Jules Furthman, the blemished noirish character named Mother Gin Sling is instead named Mother Goddamn and runs a brothel instead of a casino. What remains from all the cuts is the surreal baroque setting--a gesture to the descent of mankind into the bowels of the earth--a casino designed like Dante's Inferno. Despite the forced changes, this is still a delirious masterpiece of decadence and sexual depravity that surrounds itself with Eastern motifs that are meant to mystify rather than enlighten."

References

External links
 
 
 
 The Shanghai Gesture at Film Noir of the Week by Sheila O'Malley
 The Shanghai Gesture informational site and DVD review at DVD Beaver (includes images)
 
 Still Photos from 'the Shanghai Gesture' by Ned Scott

1941 films
1941 drama films
American black-and-white films
Film noir
Films directed by Josef von Sternberg
Films set in Shanghai
Films about gambling
United Artists films
Films with screenplays by Jules Furthman
Films produced by Arnold Pressburger
American films based on plays
American drama films
1940s English-language films
1940s American films